Máel Bethad of Liberton was a powerful landowner in Lothian in the reign of King David I of Scotland. Although he was a Gael, his estate may have been predominantly Middle English-speaking, as it bears the name "Liberton", which, unless it is an improbable Anglo-Romance compound meaning "book settlement" or "free settlement", is a corruption of early Middle English hlith bere tun, "barley hill settlement". Máel Bethad's name occurs as a witness on many of King David's charters, where it is rendered in a number of corrupt forms, e.g. "Malbead de Libertona", "Malbet de Libertune", "Malbeth de Libertona", "Makbet de Libertona", "Malbet de Libertone", and perhaps "Macbetber"  Two of these names represent a confusion with the name Mac Bethad ("son of Life"), whereas the name is certainly Máel Bethad ("tonsured devotee of Life"); "Life" here is an abstract Gaelic religious concept meaning "eternal life" or "christian immortality".

See also
 Thor of Tranent

Notes

References
 Lawrie, Sir Archibald, Early Scottish Charters Prior to A.D. 1153, (Glasgow, 1905)
 Ross, David, Scottish Place-Names, (Edinburgh, 2001)

Medieval Gaels from Scotland
12th-century Scottish people
People associated with Edinburgh
Year of birth missing
Year of death missing
Place of birth unknown
Scottish landowners